Ha Jae-Hoon (born October 3, 1984) is a South Korean football player who, as of 2011 is playing for Changwon City FC.

He was played at Korea National League side Changwon City FC since 2007 to 2008. He was played 44 games and four assists for Changwon.

Club career statistics

References

External links
 

1984 births
Living people
South Korean footballers
Gangwon FC players
K League 1 players
Association football defenders
Changwon City FC players